Lorenzo Prisco (born 16 February 1987 in Nocera Inferiore) is an Italian goalkeeper who currently plays for Pergocrema.

References

External links
 

1987 births
Living people
Sportspeople from the Province of Salerno
Italian footballers
Delfino Pescara 1936 players
S.S. Juve Stabia players
S.S.D. Città di Brindisi players
People from Nocera Inferiore
Association football goalkeepers
Footballers from Campania